Ronnie Foster Live: Cookin' with Blue Note at Montreux is a live album by American jazz organist Ronnie Foster recorded at the Montreux Jazz Festival in 1973 and released on the Blue Note label.

Reception
The Allmusic review awarded the album 3 stars.

Track listing
All compositions by Ronnie Foster except as indicated
 "East Oh Ginger Trees" (Jim Seals, Dash Croft) - 11:48
 "Chunky" - 8:12 
 "Boogie Juice" - 14:00
 "Sameness" - 11:24

Personnel
Ronnie Foster - organ
Gregory Miller - guitar
Marvin Chappell - drums

References 

Blue Note Records live albums
Ronnie Foster albums
1973 live albums
Albums recorded at the Montreux Jazz Festival
albums produced by George Butler (record producer)